Ochyropus gigas is a species of beetle in the family Carabidae, the only species in the genus Ochyropus.

References

Scaritinae